Ghaav: The Wound is a 2002 crime drama film directed by Kumar Jay. The main character of the film is Tanya (Seema Biswas).

Music
"Aate Jaate Ye Hawa" - Kumar Sanu, Kavita Krishnamurthy
"Karle Mere Saath" - Bela Shende
"Kudiye Jawab Nahi" - Kumar Sanu, Sanjeevani
"Maane Ya Na Maane" - KK, Sapna Mukherjee
"Mere Jaisa Koi Nahi" - Jaspinder Narula, Arun Bakshi
"Zindagi Ek Banjaran" - Udit Narayan, Alka Yagnik

References

External links 

2002 films
2000s Hindi-language films
2002 crime drama films
Indian crime drama films